Aaron J. Bear (born 2 February 1977), known as A. J. Bear, is an Australian former alpine skier who competed in the 2002 and 2006 Winter Olympics.

References

External links
 
 

1977 births
Living people
Australian male alpine skiers
Alpine skiers at the 2002 Winter Olympics
Alpine skiers at the 2006 Winter Olympics
Olympic alpine skiers of Australia
Skiers from Sydney